
Métropole Rouen Normandie is the métropole, an intercommunal structure, centred on the city of Rouen. It is located in the Seine-Maritime department, in the Normandy region, north-western France. It was created in January 2015, replacing the previous Communauté d'agglomération Rouen-Elbeuf-Austreberthe. Its area is 663.8 km2. Its population was 492,681 in 2014, of which 111,360 in Rouen proper.

History 
The Agglomeration community of Rouen-Elbeuf-Austreberthe (French: Communauté d'agglomération Rouen-Elbeuf-Austreberthe) was created in 2010. On January 1, 2015, the Metropolis replaced the agglomeration community in accordance with a law of January 2014.

Responsibilities 
The goal of the Métropole is to build a better metropolitan area by synchronizing the transport system, environmental actions, etc.

Communes 
The 71 communes of the Métropole Rouen Normandie are:

Amfreville-la-Mi-Voie
Anneville-Ambourville
Les Authieux-sur-le-Port-Saint-Ouen
Bardouville
Belbeuf
Berville-sur-Seine
Bihorel
Bois-Guillaume
Bonsecours
Boos
La Bouille
Canteleu
Caudebec-lès-Elbeuf
Cléon
Darnétal
Déville-lès-Rouen
Duclair
Elbeuf
Épinay-sur-Duclair
Fontaine-sous-Préaux
Franqueville-Saint-Pierre
Freneuse
Gouy
Grand-Couronne
Le Grand-Quevilly
Hautot-sur-Seine
Hénouville
Le Houlme
Houppeville
Isneauville
Jumièges
La Londe
Malaunay
Maromme
Le Mesnil-Esnard
Le Mesnil-sous-Jumièges
Montmain
Mont-Saint-Aignan
Moulineaux
La Neuville-Chant-d'Oisel
Notre-Dame-de-Bondeville
Oissel
Orival
Petit-Couronne
Le Petit-Quevilly
Quevillon
Quévreville-la-Poterie
Roncherolles-sur-le-Vivier
Rouen
Sahurs
Saint-Aubin-Celloville
Saint-Aubin-Épinay
Saint-Aubin-lès-Elbeuf
Sainte-Marguerite-sur-Duclair
Saint-Étienne-du-Rouvray
Saint-Jacques-sur-Darnétal
Saint-Léger-du-Bourg-Denis
Saint-Martin-de-Boscherville
Saint-Martin-du-Vivier
Saint-Paër
Saint-Pierre-de-Manneville
Saint-Pierre-de-Varengeville
Saint-Pierre-lès-Elbeuf
Sotteville-lès-Rouen
Sotteville-sous-le-Val
Tourville-la-Rivière
Le Trait
Val-de-la-Haye
Yainville
Ymare
Yville-sur-Seine

See also 
 Communauté de communes Seine-Austreberthe (1998-2010)
 Transport in Rouen

References

Rouen Normandie
Rouen Normandie